Symplocos mezii is a species of plant in the family Symplocaceae. It is endemic to Peru.

References

Endemic flora of Peru
mezii
Vulnerable plants
Taxonomy articles created by Polbot